"Nobody's Fault" (stylized in sentence case) is the first single from Japanese idol group Sakurazaka46 after their renaming and repositioning from Keyakizaka46. It was released on December 9, 2020. The title track features Hikaru Morita as center. The single debuted atop the Oricon Singles Chart and the Billboard Japan Hot 100, selling over 408,000 copies in Japan in its first week of release.

Background and release 
"Nobody's Fault" was premiered during Keyakizaka46's Last Live KEYAKIZAKA46 Live Online, but with YOU! on October 13, 2020. Hikaru Morita was featured as centre position in the choreography for the title song, making her the first second-generation member to hold such position after the departure of Yurina Hirate, the most renowned member of the group. Karin Fujiyoshi and Ten Yamasaki also took center positions in coupling tracks as the management committee set forth, made it technically a trio-center. The formation was announced on the Sakurazaka46 starring variety show Soko Magattara, Sakurazaka? prior to the premiere. There is no "unit song" and "solo song" on this release though a three-row formation was kept. Apart from the third-row members being rotated in different songs, the first and second row members, named , were featured in all tracks.

Music video 
The music video for the title song was taken in Sadogashima, west of Niigata Prefecture. It was directed by Shohei Goto, also known as the director of Mizkan, Shiseido, Sony and Uniqlo commercials. It reached 1 million views in 2 days after released on YouTube.

Track listing 

All lyrics are written by Yasushi Akimoto, except off vocal version track.

Type-A 

Credits adapted from album liner notes.

Type-B 

Credits adapted from album liner notes.

Type-C 

Credits adapted from album liner notes.

Type-D 

Credits adapted from album liner notes.

Regular edition 

Credits adapted from album liner notes.

Special edition 

Credits adapted from Apple Music

Charts

Weekly charts

Year-end charts

References 

2020 singles
2020 songs
Sakurazaka46 songs
Songs with lyrics by Yasushi Akimoto
Sony Music Entertainment Japan singles